Nikola III may refer to:

 Nikola III Erdödy (1630–1693)
 Nikola III Ogramić (died 1701), Roman Catholic bishop of Bosnia, see Roman Catholic Diocese of Bosnia
 Nikola III Zrinski (1488–1534)

See also

 Nikola Tre (Nikola 3), battery-electric truck from the Nikola Motor Company, aimed for production in 2021
 
 Nikola (disambiguation)
 Nicholas III (disambiguation)